During the 2000–01 English football season, Newcastle United F.C. competed in the FA Premier League. This article covers the squad and match results for that season.

Season summary
Bobby Robson's first full season as Newcastle manager saw them finish 11th once again - more than high enough to avoid relegation, but not quite high enough to get into Europe.

Final league table

Results summary

Results by round

Matches

Pre-season

Premier League

FA Cup

League Cup

First-team squad
Squad at end of season

Left club during season

Reserves and youth

Reserve squad
The following players did not make an appearance for the senior squad this season.

Trialists

Appearances, goals and cards
Starts + substitute appearances

Starting 11
Considering starts in all competitions
Considering a 4-5-1 formation
 GK: #1,  Shay Given, 35
 RB: #2,  Warren Barton, 29
 CB: #5,  Alain Goma, 23
 CB: #18,  Aaron Hughes, 39
 LB: #12,  Andy Griffin, 20
 RM: #15,  Nolberto Solano, 35
 CM: #8,  Kieron Dyer, 30
 CM: #6,  Clarence Acuna, 26
 CM: #11,  Gary Speed, 41
 LM: #10,  Christian Bassedas, 20
 CF: #9,  Alan Shearer, 23 (#7,  Rob Lee has 24 starts as a CM)

Coaching staff

Club transfers

In

 Total spending:  £17,200,000

Out

 Total spending:  £22,400,000

References

External links
FootballSquads - Newcastle United - 2000/01
Newcastle United transfers under Bobby Robson
Newcastle United Football Club - Fixtures 2000-01
Season Details - 2000-01 - toon1892
Newcastle - Player Appearances - Soccerbase

Newcastle United F.C. seasons
Newcastle United